Édouard Ferdinand Ernest Maire (28 February 1848 – 19 August 1932) was a French missionary and plant collector in China. He served as Pro-Vicar Apostolic of Yunnan. Between 1905 and 1916 he sent the plant material he collected to various herbaria in Europe. From time to time he also collected seeds. He collected most actively on the plateaus surrounding his seat in Kunming, but he sometimes made trips to the more than 3000 m high limestone mountains near Dongchuan to the North-East. His collections were described by, among others, Léveillé and Franchet in Paris.

Several plants were named in honor of Édouard-Ernest Maire including Epipactis mairei, Fargesia mairei, Nomocharis mairei, Paeonia mairei, Primula mairei and Sedum mairei.

References 

1848 births
1932 deaths
20th-century French botanists
French Roman Catholic missionaries
Roman Catholic missionaries in China
Paris Foreign Missions Society missionaries
French expatriates in China
Missionary botanists